Gyula (Julius) Moravcsik (Budapest, 29 January 1892 – Budapest, 10 December 1972), who usually wrote just as Gy. Moravcsik, was a Hungarian professor of Greek philology and Byzantine history who in 1967 was awarded the Pour le Mérite for Sciences and Arts.

Scholarship
Moravcsik explored in depth the relationship between Byzantium and the Turkic peoples, broadly defined and so including Hungarians, and this was reflected in the two volumes of Byzantinoturcica and the 1953 Bizánc és a Magyarság (Byzantium and the Magyars).

With R.J.H. Jenkins, he produced the important new critical and translated edition of Constantine VII Porphyrogenitus' De Administrando Imperio. That work was first published in Budapest, 1949, and later at Dumbarton Oaks. Moravcsik also contributed to the later Commentary, also in the Dumbarton Oaks series.

Family
His elder son Michael Moravcsik (1928–1989), became professor of physics at University of Oregon. His younger son, Julius Moravcsik (1931–2009), became a professor of philosophy at Stanford University.  His daughter, Edith A. Moravcsik, became a professor of linguistics at the University of Wisconsin-Milwaukee. His grandson, Andrew Moravcsik, became Professor of Politics and International Affairs at Princeton University.

Selected publications
Byzantinoturcica I and II, Budapest 1942 & 1943. Second edition, Berlin 1958.
Bizánc és a Magyarság. 1953.
Studia Byzantina. 1967.

References

Further reading
Bibliography of Moravcsik's works by R. Benedicty in Acta Antiqua Acad. Sc. Hung. 10 (1962): 295–313.

External links
 

1892 births
1972 deaths
Writers from Budapest
20th-century Hungarian historians
Recipients of the Pour le Mérite (civil class)
Members of the German Academy of Sciences at Berlin
Hungarian classical scholars

Scholars of Byzantine history